Mohammad Yousef Pashtun is an Afghan technocrat and politician. He served as Minister of Urban Development and Housing for two terms (2002-2003, 2005-2010) and as Governor of Kandahar province in 2003, replacing Gul Agha Sherzai under President Hamid Karzai's administration. In 2010, he was appointed as Senior Adviser to President Karzai on Construction, Mines, Water & Energy. In 2014, minister Pashtun continued to serve as Senior Adviser to President Ashraf Ghani. Yِousef Pashtun is also chairing the Kabul New City Development Authority Board.

Biography
Yousef Pashtun, an ethnic Pashtun of the Barakzai tribe, was born in the city of Kandahar. He was born to one of the elite families of Kandahar on November 15, 1946. His grandfather, General Mohammad Nabi Khan was the Army Chief of Southern Zone of Afghanistan during the Third Afghan - Anglo War under the command of King Amanullah Khan. His father, Brigadier Mohammad Ghani Khan, served as Corps Commander of Eastern and afterwards Northern Zone of Afghanistan. His maternal grandfather Haji Gul Muhammad Khan was an active politician and key figure in Southern Afghanistan's political leadership. Pashtun graduated from Ahmad Shah Baba High School in 1965. He began studying Engineering at Kabul University, and being ranked in top 10 of Afghanistan's Higher Secondary Board Exam, he soon received a USAID/Kabul University scholarship to attend American University of Beirut in Lebanon, where Pashtun earned a bachelor's degree in Architecture, and two master's degrees, one in Architecture (1973) and Urban Design and Planning (1977).

After his Masters, he worked in "Dar-ul-Handasa Design & Construction Company" in the Middle East. Under this company he worked on the master plans of Dubai and Ras-al-Khaima cities. After his return to Afghanistan he worked as a lecturer in Engineering Faculty of Kabul University.

During Soviet invasion
After the Soviet invasion, Yousef Pashtun escaped three times from Soviet troops and finally had to leave Afghanistan, and he took refuge to Pakistan. In Pakistan he started helping the Mujahideen fighters against Soviet troops. He started to provide Foreign aid to the Mujahideen and also founded Al-Jehad Hospital for free treatment of Afghan Mujahideen. Having secret trips to Afghanistan to provide financial and medical aid for the Mujahideen, he worked a lot for the victory of Mujahideen over Soviet troops. During the war against Soviet invasion he formed strong ties with United Nations and then he founded several other NGOs like Mercy Corps International (MCI) for the agricultural development of Afghanistan, Demining Agency for Afghanistan (DAFA) and Rehabilitating Infrastructure for Rural Afghanistan (RIFRA) for the development of Afghanistan.

Taliban Era
After the Soviet withdrawal he was proposed so many posts in the Afghan Mujahideen's Government but he refused and continued with his task of reinstating the Former King of Afghanistan Mohammad Zahir Shah. He lived in exile in Quetta, in Pakistan where he worked to reinstate the previous king of Afghanistan, Zahir Shah. During exile in Quetta, Yousef Pashtun along with some other Prominent Afghan Political figures like Abdul Ahad Karzai(father of Hamid Karzai), Hamid Karzai, Gul Agha Sherzai and other figures worked to reinstate the former Afghan king. He has also worked in the executive committee of Loya Jirga under the command of Mohammad Zahir Shah (The father of the Nation and former King of Afghanistan).

After the Fall of Taliban
During U.S. Invasion over Taliban Government in 2001, Yousef Pashtun along with Gul Agha Sherzai and assistance from American special forces attacked the Southern Zone and captured Kandahar city within a week. When Gul Agha Sherzai was announced as Governor of Kandahar in January 2002, Pashtun was appointed as the Executive coordinator of Kandahar province to reinstate the local Government.

Kandahar Governor

Karzai's government ruled that officials could not hold military and civil posts simultaneously, hence Hamid Karzai replaced Gul Agha Sherzai as the Governor of Kandahar and appointed Yousef Pashtun on 15 August 2003. Sherzai transferred the power peacefully as Pashtun was much close to him and they were from the same Barakzai tribe. Yousef Pashtun was seen as central government loyalist and more effective administrator, Afghan officials said. International Community was also interested to work with him for the rehabilitation of Kandahar as he was an experienced Urban plan with technical expertise. Yousef Pashtun tried to enhance the development projects in Kandahar which created more job opportunities for the locals, leading to the stabilization of the region. He was successful so far in his goals, to achieve development and peace in the province. As he was not known as a Tribal leader, but as an intellectual, hence he was able to unite the tribes efficiently. During his term, he reduced the poppy cultivation by 40% in the province. Yousef Pashtun created special unit for coordinating foreign aid to be channeled through one channel and spent on prioritized projects. He also worked on uniting the Governors of Southern Afghanistan (Kandahar, Helmand, Oruzgan, Zabul and Nimroz) to cooperate with each other. He worked on Kandahar city's new master plan, rehabilitation of city roads and upgrading the local Municipality System in the city.

Minister of Urban Development

In 2002, he was appointed Minister of Urban Development and Housing under the Transitional Government, and a year later, was appointed Governor of Kandahar Province. In 2004 after the start of Republic Government of Afghanistan, he returned to Kabul resuming his role as Minister of Urban Development and Housing. In 2006 he got vote of confidence from the Parliament to resume his post as the Minister of Urban Development. As a Minister of Urban Development, he established an Independent Board for the Development of Kabul New City. The Board brings together key stakeholders, including relevant government agencies, as well as urban specialists and economists. The board prepared a master plan for the city in the context of Greater Kabul. The master plan and its implementation strategy for 2025 were endorsed by the Afghan Cabinet in early 2009. Soon, as a top priority, the initiative turned into one of the biggest commercially viable national development project of the country, expected to be led by the private sector. During his term, he was able to complete the Strategic expansion plans for all major cities of Afghanistan which counts up to 20 cities.

Minister Yousef Pashtun played the leading role in the rehabilitation of Current Parliament of Afghanistan. He is actively leading the Design and Construction of New Parliament of Afghanistan to be built by 2015.

Senior Adviser Minister to the President of Afghanistan on Construction, Mines, Water & Energy 

In the second term of Hamid Karzai as the President of Afghanistan, he resigned from Urban Development ministry. Later, Karzai was appointed him as the Senior Adviser Minister to the President of Afghanistan on Construction, Mines, Water & Energy. After 2014 Presidential elections, newly elected President Mohammad Ashraf Ghani reappointed him. Pashtun leads different National Technical Committees for Construction, Urban Development, Public Works, Mines, Transportation, Water & Energy. He currently chairs Independent Board of Kabul New City Development.

Minister Pashtun was also a prominent candidate for the post of Director General, UN-Habitat representing South Asian Countries in 2010.

Public Image 

Pashtun is much known for his strict fight against land mafia when he was Minister of Urban Development as well as Senior Adviser to the President. He is currently Head of the Committee for counter land grabbing and land mafia. He got much public acclaim when he revealed the name of Marshal Qaseem Fahim, the then Vice President of Afghanistan as the leader of land mafia and involved in several huge land grabbing cases in Afghanistan on National Television. This interview portrayed his image as a Politician who is much blunt and not involved in political deals in Afghanistan. Some political analysts highlights his transfer from Minister to Senior Adviser to President as a move to keep him more involved in this fight against land mafia. Unlike Cabinet minister who is answerable to both houses of Parliament, Vice Presidents and other Government authorities, as Adviser of President he can perform his job without any interruption from Members of Parliaments or any other political group. He is also known as one of the most influential Adviser to President Karzai, especially on technical issues.

Personal life

Yousef Pashtun married Qamar Angaar, daughter of Late Faiz Mohammad Angaar. Faiz Mohammad Angaar was a renowned Afghan political activist, reformist and Editor-in-Chief of local weekly newspaper "Angaar" (Burning Embers). Minister Pashtun is father of two sons and three daughters. He was born in a large family of 18 siblings.  He has fluency in Pashto, Dari, English, Urdu, Arabic and Armenian languages.

Publications & Studies

Paper Studies

Memberships

Awards

References

External links

- Yousef Pashtun's biography on Embassy of Afghanistan's website
- Yousef Pashtun's Interview in 2002
Yousef Pashtun's Interview in 2004
http://ourworldleaders.com/Afghanistan/Yousef/PASHTUN
http://www.irinnews.org/InDepthMain.aspx?InDepthId=21&ReportId=63021
https://books.google.com/books?isbn=1842773771
http://articles.latimes.com/2003/aug/17/world/fg-afghan17
http://www.maykuth.com/afghan/kabul920.html
http://e-ariana.com/ariana/eariana.nsf/allDocs/8E358529D1B893488725733C0039D596?OpenDocument
http://news.bbc.co.uk/2/hi/south_asia/6981035.stm
 
 

Pashtun people
1946 births
Living people
Politicians of Kandahar Province
Afghan expatriates in Pakistan
Housing ministers of Afghanistan
Urban planning ministers of Afghanistan
Governors of Kandahar Province
People from Quetta